Viru may refer to:
 Virumaa, a region and ancient county in Northern Estonia, now divided between:
 Lääne-Viru County
 Ida-Viru County
 Viru, Võru County, village in Rõuge Parish, Võru County, Estonia
 Viru, Iran, a village in Golestan Province, Iran
 Virú, a town in the La Libertad region of Peru
 Viru (beer), a brand of Estonian beer produced by A. Le Coq
 Viru Brewery, a brewery in Estonia
 Viru Hotel, hotel in Tallinn, Estonia
Viru Valley, a town and valley on the north coast of Peru, best known for its archaeological heritage
 Virender Sehwag (born 1978), Indian cricketer
a character in the Persian/Parthian romance Vis o Ramin
 The Battle of Viru Harbor, a battle on New Georgia during World War II